Cirelli is an Italian surname. Notable people with the surname include:

Anthony Cirelli (born 1997), Canadian ice hockey player
Henri Cirelli (1934–2021), Luxembourger footballer
Marcelo Cirelli (born 1984), Argentine footballer
Mary Cirelli (born 1939), American politician
Vincent Cirelli, American special effects supervisor

Italian-language surnames